Ridley Scott is an English director and producer.

His major works include, the science fiction horror film Alien (1979), the neo-noir dystopian film Blade Runner (1982), the road adventure film Thelma & Louise (1991), the historical drama film Gladiator (2000), the war film Black Hawk Down (2001), and the science fiction comedy The Martian (2015). Some of his later works include Kingdom of Heaven (2005), American Gangster (2007), Robin Hood (2010), Prometheus (2012), and All the Money in the World (2017). In 2021 his films, The Last Duel and House of Gucci were released.

Scott has received various awards and nominations including four Academy Award nominations including three nominations for Best Director for Thelma & Louise (1991), Gladiator (2000), and Black Hawk Down (2001). He also received a nomination for Best Picture for The Martian (2015). Scott has also received five Golden Globe Award nominations winning for Best Motion Picture – Musical or Comedy for The Martian (2015). He also received 10 Primetime Emmy Award nominations for his work on television winning twice for The Gathering Storm (2002), and Gettysburg (2011).

In 1995 both Scott and his brother Tony received a BAFTA for Outstanding British Contribution to Cinema. In 2003 he was knighted for services to the British film industry. In a 2004 BBC poll, Scott was ranked 10 on the list of most influential people in British culture. He received an honorary doctorate from the Royal College of Art in London in 2015 and the BAFTA Fellowship for lifetime achievement in 2018.

Major associations

Academy Awards

British Academy Film Awards

Primetime Emmy Award

Golden Globe Awards

Industry awards

American Film Institute

Cannes Film Festival

Directors Guild of America

National Board of Review

Miscellaneous awards

Saturn Awards

Satellite Awards

Visual Effects Society

Directed Academy Award performances

Scott has directed multiple Oscar nominated performances resulting in one win.

References 

Scott, Ridley
Ridley Scott